Kragh is a surname. Notable people with the surname include:

 Anna Magdalene Kragh, poet, novelist, short story writer and playwright
Brian Kragh, Danish sprint kayaker
Helge Kragh (born 1944), Danish historian of science 
 Inger Kragh (1915–2004), Danish/Norwegian sports swimmer and diver